Francisco Javier de Elío y Olóndriz (Pamplona, 1767 – Valencia, 1822), was a Spanish soldier, governor of Montevideo. He was also instrumental in the Absolutist repression after the restoration of Ferdinand VII as King of Spain. For this, he was executed during the Trienio Liberal.

Political Chief of Río de la Plata
Francisco Javier de Elío was governor of Montevideo between 1807 and 1809, when he plotted with Martín de Álzaga against his superior Santiago de Liniers, Viceroy of the Río de la Plata. This failed because Liniers was supported by Cornelio Saavedra and criollo militias.

In May 1810, Liniers' successor Baltasar Hidalgo de Cisneros was deposed by the May Revolution. Elío remained in control of Montevideo and the Banda Oriental and declared himself Viceroy of Río de la Plata, which was confirmed as Political Chief by the Cortes of Cádiz on January 19, 1811.

One month later the rural population of the Banda Oriental under José Gervasio Artigas also rebelled against Spain, and in May the troops of Elío were beaten in the Battle of Las Piedras.
Only left in control of Colonia del Sacramento and Montevideo, Elío returned to Spain on November 18, 1811, and resigned as Political Chief in January 1812.

Back in Spain
When King Ferdinand VII of Spain returned in 1814 from exile in France, he was requested by the Cortes to respect the liberal Spanish Constitution of 1812, which seriously limited the royal powers. Ferdinand refused and went to Valencia instead of Madrid. 
Here, on April 17, general Elío invited the King to reclaim his absolute rights and put his troops at the King's disposition.

A fervent follower of the absolutist cause, Elío played an important role in the repression of the supporters of the Constitution of 1812. For this, he was arrested during the Trienio Liberal and executed.

Copla
The Official Chronicler of the City of Madrid from 1966 to 1983, Federico Carlos Sáinz de Robles, mentions in his essay Autobiography of Madrid (1957), a popular copla in Madrid in 1814 and 1815 about Elío and two other generals, Joaquín Ibáñez, 3rd Baron de Eroles and Francisco de Eguía, the three of whom were considered "uncouth, fanatical and cruel":

Eguía, Eroles, Elío...Dios te libre de los tres;porque si Dios no te libra,¡Santíguate y muérete!¡Santíguate y muérete!(Eguía, Eroles, Elío...God save you from the threebecause if God doesn't save youMake the sign of the cross and prepare to die!Make the sign of the cross and prepare to die!)

See also
 First Siege of Montevideo
 Dissolution of the Viceroyalty of the Río de la Plata

References

External links
 Biografía de Francisco Javier de Elío
 Biografía de la Encarta, Francisco Javier de Elío (archived 2009-10-31)

Governors of Montevideo
Viceroys of the Río de la Plata
1767 births
1822 deaths
Colonial Uruguay
People from Pamplona
Spanish captain generals
Spanish generals
Royalists in the Hispanic American Revolution
1810 in Argentina
1811 in Argentina
1810s in the Viceroyalty of the Río de la Plata
People from the Kingdom of Navarre
Executed Spanish people